Arizona's 29th Legislative District is one of 30 in the state, situated in central Maricopa County. As of 2021, there are 33 precincts in the district, with a total registered voter population of 95,481. The district has an overall population of 247,936.

Political representation
The district is represented for the 2021–2022 Legislative Session in the State Senate by Martín Quezada (D, Phoenix) and in the House of Representatives by Richard C. Andrade (D, Phoenix) and Cesar Chavez (D, Phoenix).

References

Maricopa County, Arizona
Arizona legislative districts